In the first edition of the tournament, Nana Miyagi and Suzanna Wibowo won the title by defeating Rika Hiraki and Akemi Nishiya 6–1, 6–4 in the final.

Seeds

Draw

Draw

References

External links
 Official results archive (ITF)
 Official results archive (WTA)

Doubles